Tomensis is Latin for "of Thomas" or "of the island of São Tomé". It may refer to several species:

Barleeia tomensis, a species of barley snail
Chaerephon tomensis, the São Tomé free-tailed bat
Lellingeria tomensis, a fern species
Mycetophila tomensis, a fungus gnat species 
Pseudoclanis tomensis, a species of hawkmoths found on the island of São Tomé, São Tomé and Príncipe
Pterostichus tomensis, a ground beetle species
Trentepohlia tomensis, a crane fly species

It also may refer to a subspecies:
Rousettus aegyptiacus tomensis, a subspecies of the Egyptian fruit bat

See also
Thomensis (disambiguation)
Thomae (disambiguation)
Santomensis/Saotomensis (disambiguation)